Marko Avramović (Serbian Cyrillic: Марко Аврамовић; born August 24, 1986, in Belgrade, Serbia, SFR Yugoslavia) is a Serbian water polo player. He played for Crvena Zvezda. He is also a part of the Serbian National team.

Club career

Partizan Raiffeisen
In May, 2011. just as Partizan Raiffeisen finished the Euroleague quarterfinal stage competition, winning first place with the maximum number of points, problems have emerged.  Member of Serbian national team, Marko Avramović decided to request the termination of the contract with the club so far. The reason was as he said, unprofessional and improper relationship between him and Partizan leaders. The problems started in a period when he missed the last three games in Euroleague against Budva, Jug and Jadran. Speaking for Sports Journal, Avramović said: "At a press conference before the away match with Budva was stated I will not play in that match because of my poor form, which was not true. The reason is, that I refused to revise my current contract, I did not want my wages to be reduced."

Crvena Zvezda
On 17 February Avramović scored his first goal of the Serbian National Championship, in the third round of the "A League", in a 7–4 win over VK Beograd.

Clubs he played for
 2002–2011 Partizan Raiffeizen
 2011–2015 Crvena Zvezda
 2015–2017 Ferencvárosi TC
 2017– Egri VK

Honours

Club
VK Partizan
 National Championship of Serbia (5): 2006–07, 2007–08, 2008–09, 2009–10, 2010–11
 National Cup of Serbia (5): 2006–07, 2007–08, 2008–09, 2009–10, 2010–11
 Eurointer League (1): 2010
VK Crvena Zvezda
 National Championship of Serbia (1): 2012–13
 National Cup of Serbia (1): 2012–13
Ferencvárosi TC
LEN Euro Cup (1): 2016-17

See also
 List of world champions in men's water polo
 List of World Aquatics Championships medalists in water polo

References

External links
 
 Marko Avramović at Water Polo Association of Serbia (archived)

1986 births
Living people
Serbian male water polo players
Sportspeople from Belgrade
World Aquatics Championships medalists in water polo
Mediterranean Games gold medalists for Serbia
Competitors at the 2009 Mediterranean Games
Mediterranean Games medalists in water polo
Universiade medalists in water polo
Universiade gold medalists for Serbia and Montenegro